Ollie Newton (born 22 August 1988) is a New Zealand cricketer. He made his Twenty20 debut for Wellington on 6 December 2015 in the 2015–16 Georgie Pie Super Smash. He made his first-class debut for Wellington in the 2017–18 Plunket Shield season on 23 October 2017. He made his List A debut for Wellington in the 2017–18 Ford Trophy on 27 January 2018. In June 2018, he was awarded a contract with Wellington for the 2018–19 season. He was the joint-leading wicket-taker for Wellington in the 2018–19 Super Smash, with eleven dismissals in nine matches.

In June 2020, he was offered a contract by Wellington ahead of the 2020–21 domestic cricket season.

References

External links
 

1988 births
Living people
New Zealand cricketers
Wellington cricketers
Cricketers from Dunedin